The Icelandic Men's Basketball Supercup is a professional basketball super cup competition that opposes the latest winners of the Úrvalsdeild – the top-tier Icelandic national men's domestic league – and the winners of the Icelandic Basketball Cup, the top-tier national men's cup competition in Iceland. Created in 1995, it is organised by the Icelandic Basketball Federation – who run the Úrvalsdeild and the Icelandic Cup, and it traditionally opens the season.

Title holders 
Njarðvík are the record-holders with eight cups.

 1995 Njarðvík
 1996 Grindavík 
 1997 Keflavík 
 1998 Grindavík 
 1999 Njarðvík
 2000 KR
 2001 Njarðvík
 2002 Njarðvík 
 2003 Keflavík 
 2004 Njarðvík 
 2005 Njarðvík 
 2006 Njarðvík
 2007 KR 
 2008 Keflavík  
 2009 Stjarnan 
 2010 Snæfell  
 2011 Grindavík 
 2012 Grindavík 
 2013 Grindavík 
 2014 KR  
 2015 KR 
 2016 Þór Þorlákshöfn
 2017 Þór Þorlákshöfn
 2018 Tindastóll
 2019 Stjarnan 
 2020 Stjarnan 
 2021 Þór Þorlákshöfn
 2022 Valur

See also
 Úrvalsdeild karla
 Icelandic Men's Basketball Cup
 Icelandic Basketball Federation

References

External links

Sports leagues established in 1995
Recurring sporting events established in 1995
Iceland